Kankai Municipality is a municipality in Jhapa District of eastern Nepal.

This municipality is formed merging two village development committees i.e. Ghailadubba and Surunga in May 2014. This municipality is one of the developed and biggest municipalities in Jhapa.

Trade centers
 Ghailadubba
 Surunga
 Durgapur, Jhapa
 Laxmipur, Jhapa

Tourist destinations
 Kankai Dham (Kotihome)
 Jamunkhadi Simsar
 Domukha Jhapa
 Dhanuskoti Dham
 Selfi Dada
 Jhandi dada
 Naya basti plotting

References

Populated places in Jhapa District
Municipalities in Koshi Province
Nepal municipalities established in 2014
Municipalities in Jhapa District